This is a list of airborne wind energy or kite-energy organizations that are advancing airborne wind energy systems (AWES).
In 2011 there were over 40 organizations involved worldwide, but this number has increased to over 60 in 2017.

Categories of kite-energy or airborne-wind-energy organizations that are forming the nascent industry: education, academic, non-profit, for-profit, communication, research, original kite-energy equipment manufacturer, kite-line manufacturer, industry-wide association, history, testing, forum entity, library, cooperative, consortium, group, club, school, training school.

Generation by kite-energy systems may involve pumping, electricity generators flown in the upper flying system (flygen), electric generators situated on the land or sea or on board a vessel (groundgen), simple lifting of objects (lifting), pulling hulls or other objects (traction), or transportation; systems generate energy to do special tasks. Systems may be scaled from tiny to utility size.

Organizations

References

Airborne wind power
Aviation-related lists
Kites
Lists of organizations